P2X purinoceptor 6 is a protein that in humans is encoded by the P2RX6 gene.

The protein encoded by this gene belongs to the family of P2X receptors, which are ATP-gated ion channels and mediate rapid and selective permeability to cations. This gene is predominantly expressed in skeletal muscle, and regulated by p53. The encoded protein is associated with VE-cadherin at the adherens junctions of human umbilical vein endothelial cells.

See also
 Purinergic receptor

References

Further reading

External links 
 

Ion channels